Seasonal variation in human birth rate has been found to be a nearly universal phenomenon. Also, birth seasonality has been found to be correlated with certain physiological and psychological traits of humans and animals.

Description

Findings

Influence on medical conditions
The season in which babies are born can have a dramatic effect on their future risk relating to the development of conditions such as neurological disorders, including seasonal affective disorder, bipolar depression, schizophrenia and type I diabetes. Research has shown that the season a baby is born in can have a major effect on whether or not they will become a heavy smoker. This even varies between men to women.

Large-scale population analytic studies
Recently, large-scale population analytics have allowed for the exploration of birth month/season hypotheses among large cohorts of people. One study used 1.7 million patients from Columbia University in New York City (NYC) to confirm associations between neurological conditions, respiratory condition and reproductive conditions with birth month. In addition, they uncovered an association between cardiovascular diseases and birth month. This was subsequently confirmed in a separate study, also using data from NYC. Researchers also explored mechanisms correlated with birth season in a large population study including data from 10.5 million patients, from three countries (US, South Korea, and Taiwan) and six study sites. They found correlations between relative age and school cutoff periods. And that first trimester exposure to fine air particulates increased the risk of atrial fibrillation later in life.

As a factor in infant growth
The season during which a birth takes place has been linked to the weight development of the infant as well as initial weight.

As a factor in academic development
There is evidence that suggests that children who are born earlier while they attend the same academic year with others, gain an advantage: 
"In Britain the academic year begins in September, and there may be almost a year's chronological age difference between the eldest (September birthday) and youngest (August birthday) children in the same class. There is evidence that, in this context, children born in the autumn term (September to December birthdays) perform better academically, relative to their class peers, than those born in the spring term (January to April birthdays), who in turn outperform those born in the summer term (May to August birthdays)."

As a suicide risk factor

Birth rates of people who later complete a suicide show disproportionate excess for April, May and June compared with the other months. Overall, the risk of suicide increases by 17% for people born in the spring–early summer compared with those born in the autumn–early winter; this risk increase was larger for women (29.6%) than for men (13.7%).

Research works in Sweden show that those who preferred suicide by hanging rather than poisoning or petrol gases were significantly more likely to be born during February–April. Maximum of the month-of-birth curve for preferring hanging was for March–April and the minimum was for September–October.

References 

Seasonality
Child development
Human reproduction